Colombian Sign Language is the deaf sign language of Colombia.

Classification
Clark notes that Peruvian, Bolivian, Ecuadorian and Colombian sign languages "have significant lexical similarities to each other" and "contain a certain degree of lexical influence from ASL" as well, at least going by the forms in national dictionaries. Chilean and Argentine share these traits, though to a lesser extent.

Description
The development of the signs have influences of Spanish sign language and American Sign Language.  It is reported to have signs in common with Salvadoran Sign Language.

Teaching
There are two sign language schools in Bogotá (the first started in 1929), two in Medellín and one in Cali.  Countrywide, three different institutions of support for deaf promotes the learning of the language.   The national Committee for the sign language promotes the research in the area, distributes the manual alphabet for spelling and the Grammar Dictionary and supports the organization for sign language teachers.  The now defunct national central of telecommunications TELECOM distributed a CD-ROM software for self-learning.

Relevancy
There is a growing interest for learning the sign language between the hearing people.  Some schools use sign language in the classroom. Interpreters are provided at important public events, and for college students.

References and external links
National Institute for the Deaf - INSOR (In Spanish)
National Federation of Deaf Colombians  - FENASCOL (In Spanish)
 Colombian sign language software available in :  Lengua de Señas Colombianas (software). División de Investigación ITEC–TELECOM Colombia. http://www.c5.cl/ieinvestiga/actas/tise99/html/software/lenguassenas/
 Videos of common words available in : Lengua de señas – Un lenguaje para conocer (Sign Language – A language to know). https://web.archive.org/web/20080725140522/http://mail.colombiaaprende.edu.co:8080/recursos/lengua_senas/

Sign languages of Colombia
Languages of Colombia
Colombian culture